Novyi Svit or Novy Svet (literally: 'New World' or more correctly 'New Community') is a resort, an urban-type settlement in Sudak Municipality in the Autonomous Republic of Crimea, a territory recognized by a majority of countries as part of Ukraine and incorporated by Russia as the Republic of Crimea. It is known for Novyi Svit sparkling wine produced there. Champagne production was introduced into Novyi Svit by a local landowner, Prince Lev Golitsyn, in the late 19th century. Population: 

The town is situated in a very scenic area where numerous Soviet movies were filmed. It boasts some fine beaches, a couple of resort hotels (one of which was supposed to be for Soviet cosmonauts), a several km tunnel inside a mountain where a factory stores its products, and a large juniper forest.

References

External links
 

Sudak Municipality
Urban-type settlements in Crimea
Seaside resorts in Russia
Seaside resorts in Ukraine
Tourist attractions in Crimea
Wine regions of Russia
Wine regions of Ukraine